"Paradise City" is the name of a 1988 Guns N' Roses single and the video for it.

Paradise City may also refer to:
 Paradise City (TV series), a 2021 TV series released by Prime Video
 Paradise City, a fictional city, used by James Hadley Chase in many of his novels
 Paradise City (novel), by Lorenzo Carcaterra, published in 2004
 "Paradise City", a 1998 N-Trance single
 Paradise City, a fictional city, the setting for the video game, Burnout Paradise
 Paradise City station, a railway station in Incheon, South Korea
 Degrassi Goes Hollywood also known as Paradise City: Degrassi Goes Hollywood, a 2009 Canadian television movie
a nickname for Northampton, Massachusetts
Paradise City, a fictional city on the planet Nimbus III in Star Trek V: The Final Frontier.
 Paradise City (film), an American action film starring Bruce Willis and John Travolta
 À Paradis City, a 2015 album by Jean Leloup

See also 
 Paradise (disambiguation)